Johann Ngounou Djayo (born 27 February 2001) is a German professional footballer who plays as a forward for Wacker Burghausen.

Career
Ngounou Djayo made his professional debut for 1860 Munich in the final of the 2019–20 Bavarian Cup on 5 September 2020, starting against Würzburger Kickers, who had been promoted from the 3. Liga to the 2. Bundesliga at the end of the season, before being substituted out in the 63rd minute for Fabian Greilinger. The home match finished as a 4–1 on penalties for 1860 following a 1–1 draw after 90 minutes.

References

External links
 
 
 

2001 births
Living people
German footballers
Association football forwards
Germany youth international footballers
3. Liga players
Regionalliga players
Oberliga (football) players
TSV 1860 Munich II players
TSV 1860 Munich players
SV Wacker Burghausen players